Dhuri is a city in Sangrur District in the state of Punjab, India. The neighbouring towns of Dhuri are Sangrur, Malerkotla, Nabha, and Barnala.

Demographics
As of 2011 Indian Census, Dhuri city had a total population of 55,225 of which 29,231 were males and 25,994 were females. Population within the age group of 0 to 6 years was 6,169. The total number of literates in Dhuri was 40,067, which constituted 72.6% of the population with male literacy of 76.4% and female literacy of 68.2%. The effective literacy rate of 7+ population of Dhuri was 81.7%, of which male literacy rate was 86.4% and female literacy rate was 76.4%. The Scheduled Castes population was 14,207. Dhuri had 30460 households in 11077.

Dhuri rural had a total population of 3,529, of which 1,875 were males and 1,654 were females. Population within the age group of 0 to 6 years was 355. The total number of literates in Dhuri was 2,331.

References

Cities and towns in Sangrur district